James Garfield Schaeffer (February 1, 1885 – August 8, 1972) was a rugby union, American football and baseball coach. He served as the University of California rugby coach from 1909 to 1914, and football coach in 1915. In total he amassed a 73–16–8 record. From 1909 to 1914, California played rugby instead of American football, switching back to football rugby code, rather than the American code. He also coached the Cal baseball team from 1911 to 1915 and amassed a 39–21–2 record. Schaeffer resigned from both posts in November 1915. The executive committee of the student body denied that his resignation was forced, but there were rumors of "dissatisfaction with his services" after California was routed by Washington, 72–0. Schaeffer was involved in the recruitment process for his permanent replacement as California's football coach, offering the position to then Purdue coach Andy Smith. 

Schaeffer was born in Ohio in 1885 and died in California in 1972.

Head coaching record

Football

References

1885 births
1972 deaths
California Golden Bears rugby coaches
California Golden Bears baseball coaches
California Golden Bears football coaches
Sportspeople from Youngstown, Ohio